Jean Chérasse (born November 26, 1932 in Issoire) is a French film director, film writer, and film producer.

Filmography 
 Henri Frenay, l'inventeur de la résistance (2003)
 Marthe Richard et la tolérance (1996)
 Le Grand Retour (1995)
 France, année zéro (1994)
 La Marseillaise n'est pas encore enrouée ! (1992 with Claude Manceron)
 Le Miroir colonial (1988)
 Le Miroir des passions françaises (1986 with Theodore Zeldin)
 Les Captifs de l'An Quarante (1985)
 Paris, j'écris ton nom liberté (1984)
 La Prise du pouvoir par Philippe Pétain (1080)
 Dreyfus ou l'intolérable vérité (prix Méliès 1975)
 Valmy (1967 with Abel Gance)
 Un clair de lune à Maubeuge (1962)
 La Vendetta (1961)
 Un charlatan crépusculaire (1958 with Gérard Philipe)

External links 
 

French film directors
1932 births
Living people